Bolstone is a village and civil parish in Herefordshire, England,  south of Hereford.  According to the 2001 census, it had a population of 34.

External links

Villages in Herefordshire